Croton elegans is a flowering plant species in the genus Croton. It is a shrub endemic to the Ecuadorean Andes.

See also 
 IUCN Red List vulnerable species (Plantae)

References

External links 
 Croton elegans at iucnredlist.org

elegans
Flora of Ecuador
Plants described in 1817